Douggie Johnson is a male international table tennis player from England.

Table tennis career
He represented England in the 1981 World Table Tennis Championships in the Swaythling Cup (men's team event) with Paul Day, Desmond Douglas and John Hilton.

See also
 List of England players at the World Team Table Tennis Championships

References

English male table tennis players
Living people
Year of birth missing (living people)